Enfield Borough Football Club is a football club based in Enfield, Greater London, England.

History
The club was established by former Brimsdown management team Marvin Walker and Aaron Archer in 2016 and joined Division Two of the Spartan South Midlands League. After finishing third in the division in their first season, they were promoted to Division One. At the end of the 2020–21 season the club were transferred to Division One of the Combined Counties League.

Ground
The club played at Enfield Town's Queen Elizabeth II Stadium, before moving to the Maurice Rebak Stadium to groundshare with Wingate & Finchley prior to the 2018–19 season.

Records
Best FA Vase performance: Second round, 2017–18

See also
Enfield Borough F.C. managers

References

External links
Official website

Football clubs in England
Football clubs in London
Association football clubs established in 2016
2016 establishments in England
Sport in the London Borough of Enfield
Spartan South Midlands Football League
Combined Counties Football League